The Habib Bourguiba bibliography includes major books about President Habib Bourguiba of Tunisia, his biography, presidency and policies.

Biographies

Fight for independence

Presidency

Personal life

Political thought and policies

Legacy

Public image 
 

Habib Bourguiba
Bourguiba, Habib